James Alexander Jeggo (born 12 February 1992) is a professional footballer who plays as a central midfielder for Scottish Premiership club Hibernian. Born in Austria, he represents the Australia national team. Jeggo moved to Australia as a child, where he started his footballing career in youth football with Green Gully and at the Victorian Institute of Sport before making his professional debut for Melbourne Victory.

Early life
Jeggo was born in Vienna, Austria. He moved to Australia as a child, growing up in Melbourne, Victoria. He has a brother Luc Jeggo who formerly captained the Melbourne Victory youth team, and plays for NPL Victoria  club Green Gully SC.

Club career

Melbourne Victory
On 21 March 2011, Jeggo signed a three-year senior contract with A-League club Melbourne Victory after performing very well in the National Youth League. He made his professional debut in the 2011–12 A-League season on 12 November 2011, in a round 6 clash against Central Coast Mariners.
Jimmy Jeggo, as referred to by the Melbourne Victory fans quickly become a fan favourite in his few appearances for Melbourne.
On 10 February 2012, he was selected for his first league start for Melbourne Victory against the Central Coast Mariners at AAMI Park, where Victory went on to record a 2–1 come from behind win. Jimmy Jeggo's first league goal for the Melbourne Victory came on 16 March 2012, with a strike from outside the penalty box, in their 3–0 win over Wellington Phoenix, which would be the final home game Melbourne Victory would play in the 2011-12 A-League season.

The 2012–13 A-League season saw James Jeggo's first team opportunities reduced.  He played 310 minutes, mostly from the bench, less than half the time of his break out season of 2011–12.

Adelaide United
On 1 May 2014, Jeggo signed with Adelaide United following his release from Melbourne Victory as the Victorian A-League team declined to renew his contract. Jimmy made his debut for Adelaide in round one of the 2014–15 A-League season at Lang Park, Brisbane verse then champions Brisbane Roar. Jeggo started in midfield and played the whole match as United won two goals to one. Jeggo became a regular starter at Adelaide United under Josep Gombau, playing in attacking midfield, Jeggo won the A-League Young Footballer of the Year for the 2014–15 A-League season. Jeggo played a full match for the Reds in the inaugural  2014 FFA Cup Final. Adelaide secured victory over Perth Glory in the final 1–0 with Jeggo claiming his first club trophy of his career.

Sturm Graz
On 27 January 2016, Jeggo was released from Adelaide United to join Austrian club Sturm Graz for an undisclosed fee.

On 9 May 2018, he played as Sturm Graz beat Red Bull Salzburg in extra time to win the 2017–18 Austrian Cup.

Austria Wien
On 25 May 2018, Jeggo joined Austria Wien after rejecting a contract extension from Sturm Graz.

Aris
On 16 August 2020, Jeggo joined Greek club Aris.

Eupen
On 4 February 2022, Jeggo signed a 1.5-year contract with Eupen in Belgium.

Hibernian
Jeggo signed an 18-month contract with Scottish club Hibernian in January 2023.Jeggo made his debut a day after signing for Hibernian, starting in a 0-3 defeat to rivals Heart of Midlothian F.C. in the Scottish cup.

International career
On 7 March 2011, Jeggo was selected to represent the Australia Olympic football team in an Asian Olympic Qualifier match against Iraq.

After establishing himself in the starting squad for Sturm Graz at the beginning of the 2016–17 season, playing a key role as a defensive midfielder, Jeggo was called up to the Australia senior side for World Cup qualifiers against Saudi Arabia and Japan in October 2016.

On 20 November 2018, Jeggo made his debut for the Australia senior national team in a friendly match at ANZ Stadium against Lebanon. He came on as a second-half substitute in the 74th minute and replaced Mustafa Amini in midfield and Australia won the match 3–0.

Career statistics

Club

International

Honours
Adelaide United
 FFA Cup: 2014

Sturm Graz
 Austrian Cup: 2017–18

Individual
 A-League Young Footballer of the Year: 2014–15

References

External links
 

1992 births
Living people
Association football midfielders
Australian soccer players
Australia international soccer players
Austrian footballers
Austrian emigrants to Australia
Austrian people of English descent
Australian people of English descent
Australian people of Austrian descent
Australian people of Manx descent
Melbourne Victory FC players
Adelaide United FC players
SK Sturm Graz players
FK Austria Wien players
Aris Thessaloniki F.C. players
K.A.S. Eupen players
Victorian Institute of Sport alumni
Victorian Premier League players
A-League Men players
Austrian Football Bundesliga players
Austrian Regionalliga players
Super League Greece players
Belgian Pro League players
Australian expatriate soccer players
Expatriate footballers in Austria
Expatriate footballers in Greece
Expatriate footballers in Belgium
Australian expatriate sportspeople in Austria
Australian expatriate sportspeople in Greece
Australian expatriate sportspeople in Belgium
Footballers from Vienna
2017 FIFA Confederations Cup players
2019 AFC Asian Cup players
Australian expatriate sportspeople in Scotland
Expatriate footballers in Scotland
Hibernian F.C. players
Scottish Professional Football League players